Takashi Ichiba (born 13 December 1960) is a Japanese weightlifter. He competed at the 1984 Summer Olympics and the 1988 Summer Olympics.

References

1960 births
Living people
Japanese male weightlifters
Olympic weightlifters of Japan
Weightlifters at the 1984 Summer Olympics
Weightlifters at the 1988 Summer Olympics
Place of birth missing (living people)